The 2014 World Ports Classic was the third edition of the two-day World Ports Classic cycle race between the port cities of Rotterdam in the Netherlands and Antwerp in Belgium. The race was held as part of the 2014 UCI Europe Tour. In contrary to the previous two editions, the race was no longer scheduled near the end of August, but rather in the month of May; the race was held over 24–25 May 2014.

Race overview

Participating teams

Stages

Stage 1
24 May 2014 – Rotterdam to Antwerp,

Stage 2
25 May 2014 – Antwerp to Rotterdam,

Classification leadership table

References

External links

2014
2014 in Belgian sport
2014 UCI Europe Tour
2014 in Dutch sport